Scarborough Centre for Alternative Studies (SCAS), formerly Tabor Park Vocational School is an  alternative and adult high school serving Scarborough, a part of Toronto, Ontario, Canada.  It operates under the Toronto District School Board and was previously part of the pre-amalgamated board, Scarborough Board of Education prior to merger. Originated at Birchmount Park Collegiate Institute in 1977 as the re-entry program, the school opened in 1986 at the Tabor Park building and as of 2010, the school is located in the campus of the former Midland Avenue Collegiate Institute sharing with the fellow schools, South East Year Round Alternative Centre and Caring and Safe Schools Alternative Program Area C. SCAS is located on Midland Avenue south of Eglinton Avenue East.

History

Beginnings

The Re-entry Program in Scarborough began in November 1977 at Birchmount Park Collegiate Institute with one teacher and fifteen students. Envisioned was a program which would meet the needs of dropouts or disadvantaged learners wishing to return to school; the program had grown and transformed into an adult program. By 1985, the program featured 9.33 teachers and 200 students.

In 1980, the Co-Op Re-entry Program was established. The program featured an in-school component with a job experience placement and grew from the original two teachers and 35 students to 5 teachers and 170 students in 1986.

Formerly known as Tabor Park Vocational School, the Re-entry Programs were united and expanded as Scarborough Centre for Alternative Studies originally opened on September 2, 1986 at 959 Midland Avenue operated by the Scarborough Board of Education with 360 adults. At Tabor Park, agencies operating at SCAS included a rooms registry service called Scarborough Housing Assistance: Placement and Education for Singles (SHAPES), the counseling service Metro Youth Services, a day care facility operated by NYAD (Not Your Average Day Care), and the board's Community Liaison Office.

Relocation
In May 1988, the SBE was planning to move the SCAS to a new facility. The Tabor Park campus was one of seven high schools in the Metro being given to the Metropolitan Separate School Board (now the Toronto Catholic District School Board), so the Scarborough board had to vacate it along with the user groups. School board trustees considered closing one of the following collegiate schools to make room for a new SCAS:  Winston Churchill, Midland, Wexford, W.A. Porter, and David and Mary Thomson. In November 1988 the school had 850 adult students. Parents in Donwood Park protested one of the relocation plans for SCAS.

Meanwhile, the SBE moved classes as a method to quickly find a temporary location before the Tabor Park property being transferred to the MSSB on July 1, 1989. To save the costs, 28 classes were moved to the former Highbrook Senior Public School on 39 Highbrook Drive, Thomson Collegiate received 20 classes at 2740 Lawrence Avenue East (along with the Carpentry program) and moved the remaining six to a commercial site in the area totaling to 54 classes.

The original SCAS campus was reopened and became known as Jean Vanier Catholic Secondary School in September 1989. The need for a new adult school led to a 'unique partnership' between the SBE and Centennial College, in 1992, to establish the new campus for SCAS, (originally the Scarborough Career Planning Centre) on 939 Progress Avenue that opened in September 1994. The programs were previously had been in temporary locations after the loss of Tabor Park.

After 16 years, in September 2010, the school moved to 720 Midland Avenue, the site of the former Midland Avenue Collegiate Institute as Centennial expanded the teaching space by acquiring the latter site. The centre currently shares the Midland building with South East Year Round Alternative Centre and Caring and Safe Schools program.

SCAS also operated a satellite campus at the David and Mary Thomson Collegiate Institute for the Carpentry (Fix-It Shop) program until the Lawrence building was closed at the end of June 2019.

Overview
Like all TDSB adult learning centres, it has two distinctive programs, EdVance and Adult.

Campus

Since the school is located in the Midland Avenue Collegiate Institute facility in 2010, SCAS currently occupies some parts of the first floor, most parts of the second floor, and the entire third floor space. The school carries many modernist design features consisting of five stairwells, a circular cafeteria, a two floor library with two seminar rooms, wide guidance area, larger atrium, a theatre with more than 900 seats, 33 academic classrooms, two home economics rooms, one large lecture hall, four performing art rooms for music/dance/drama, two visual art rooms, five science labs, three gymnasia with the larger one that can be partitioned into two smaller gyms with SCAS occupying the larger gym, and large athletic field as well the track and football/soccer fields with an attached hill. The swimming pool remains partly leased.

Historically, the school was attached by a day care centre, Not Your Average Daycare, and continues to do so today.

As the Progress Campus built in the lands of Centennial College, the school was built in a triangular configuration and students would get lunches from the college's cafeteria.  Previously, SCAS had lunch service at the Tabor Park campus.

Other SCAS-affiliated schools

Alternative Scarborough Education 1
Alternative Scarborough Education 1 (ASE 1) is an alternative school originally affiliated with SCAS. Founded in 1975, the school shares the space with St. Andrew's Public School on the second floor.

Founded: 1975
Address: c/o St. Andrew's Public School - 60 Brimorton Drive, Bendale, Toronto, Ontario M1P 3Z1, Canada
School number: 4110 / 892475
Superintendent: John Chasty (ER14)
Area Trustee: David Smith (Ward 19)
Principal: Denis Lopes
Vice Principals Elizabeth Mayhew, Emanuel Moura
Grades: 11-12
Website: http://aseone.ca/moodle

Delphi Secondary Alternative School
Delphi Secondary Alternative School, formerly known as Alternative Scarborough Education 2 is an alternative school located on the second floor of the Chartland Junior Public School building. The school was founded in 1981 and in 2006, it was renamed to Delphi

Founded: 1981
Address: c/o Chartland Junior Public School - 109 Chartland Boulevard South, Agincourt, Toronto, Ontario M1S 2R7, Canada
School number: 4109 / 892483
Superintendent: Kathleen Garner
Area Trustee: TBD
Principal: Denis Lopes
Vice Principals Elizabeth Mayhew, Emanuel Moura
Grades: 9-12
Website: schoolweb.tdsb.on.ca/delphi/

Parkview Alternative School
Parkview Alternative School was originally established in the 1990s as a SCAS-branded campus known as SCAS Overflow in the former Highbrook Senior Public School building providing the alternative education for dropouts. In 2010, the school was renamed to the Overflow Centre and moved to the Terraview Learning Centre building in the Pharmacy Avenue/401 area. As of 2014, it then adopted the present name.

Address: c/o Terraview Learning Centre - 1641 Pharmacy Avenue, Maryvale, Toronto, Ontario M1R 2L4, Canada
School number: 4176 / 939480
Superintendent: Tracy Hayhurst (ER15)
Area Trustee: Manna Wong (Ward 20)
Principal: Denis Lopes
Vice Principals Elizabeth Mayhew, Emanuel Moura
Grades: 9-10

See also

List of high schools in Ontario
Midland Avenue Collegiate Institute
St. Joan of Arc Catholic Academy

References

External links
Scarborough Centre for Alternative Studies
TDSB Profile (EdVance)
TDSB Profile (Adult)

High schools in Toronto
Educational institutions established in 1977
Educational institutions established in 1986
Schools in the TDSB
1986 establishments in Ontario
Alternative education
Adult education
Relocated schools
Toronto Lands Corporation
WZMH Architects buildings
Education in Scarborough, Toronto